Ayatollah Sayyid Mohammad Ali Shirazi  (Arabic:  السيد محمد علی شيرازي) (born 1948) is an Iraqi Twelver Shi'a cleric.

He has studied in seminaries of Najaf, Iraq under Grand Ayatollah Abul-Qassim Khoei and Jawad Tabrizi. He currently lives in Iran.

Notes

External links
آرشیو خبر
پیام تسلیت آیت الله سید محمد علی شیرازی از برای وفات آیت الله علی صافی

Iraqi ayatollahs
Iraqi Islamists
Shia Islamists
1948 births
Living people